Sila Srikampang (born April 18, 1989) is a Thai professional footballer who plays as a right back for Thai League 1 club Sukhothai and the Thailand national team.

Personal life

Sila's brother Adisak Srikampang is also a footballer and plays as a forward.

International career

In June 2015, Sila debuted for Thailand against Bahrain in a friendly match.

International

References

https://th.soccerway.com/players/sila-srikampun/287377/

External links
Peofile at Goal.com

1989 births
Living people
Sila Srikampang
Sila Srikampang
Association football fullbacks
Sila Srikampang
Sila Srikampang
Sila Srikampang
Sila Srikampang